Strabane High School was a secondary school located in Strabane, County Tyrone, Northern Ireland. It was within the Western Education and Library Board area. The school colours are green, silver, and black.

Notable students
Raymond Moan (1951-), cricketer

External links
Strabane High School website

Secondary schools in County Tyrone
Defunct schools in Northern Ireland